Sverdlovsky (masculine), Sverdlovskaya (feminine), or Sverdlovskoye (neuter) may refer to:

 Sverdlovsk Oblast (Sverdlovskaya oblast), a federal subject of Russia
 Sverdlovsky District, several districts in the countries of the former Soviet Union
 Sverdlovsky Urban Settlement, a municipal formation which the Work Settlement of Sverdlovsky in Shchyolkovsky District of Moscow Oblast, Russia is incorporated as
 Sverdlovskoye Urban Settlement, a municipal formation corresponding to Sverdlovskoye Settlement Municipal Formation, an administrative division of Vsevolozhsky District of Leningrad Oblast, Russia
 Sverdlovsky (inhabited locality) (Sverdlovskaya, Sverdlovskoye), several inhabited localities in Russia

See also
 Sverdlov (disambiguation)
 Sverdlovo
 Sverdlovsk (disambiguation)